This article shows the qualifying draw for 2011 Texas Tennis Open.

Seeds

  Kateryna Bondarenko (qualified)
  Chanelle Scheepers (qualified)
  Angelique Kerber (qualified)
  Aravane Rezaï (qualified)
  Akgul Amanmuradova (qualifying competition) (Lucky loser)
  Jamie Hampton (qualifying competition)
  Alona Bondarenko (qualifying competition)
  Andreja Klepač (first round)

Qualifiers

  Kateryna Bondarenko
  Chanelle Scheepers
  Angelique Kerber
  Aravane Rezaï

Lucky losers
  Akgul Amanmuradova

Qualifying draw

First qualifier

Second qualifier

Third qualifier

Fourth qualifier

References
Qualifying Draw

2011 qualifying